PlayStation Underground is a now-defunct American video game magazine, originally published by Sony Computer Entertainment America. The magazine focused on the PlayStation fanbase, including gaming on the original Sony PlayStation and the PlayStation 2, and was promoted as a "PlayStation fan club". Unlike its paper-based counterpart the Official U.S. PlayStation Magazine, PlayStation Underground came in the form of CD-ROMs which could be played on the PlayStation and PlayStation 2 consoles. Subscribers were also given access to a members-only website. The magazine released its first issue on March 26, 1997 and its final issue in 2001. The magazine released a total of seventeen issues during its active years. The magazine was eventually merged with Official U.S. PlayStation Magazine in 2001 when it was discontinued.

In 2015, PlayStation Underground returned as a video series where gameplay from upcoming games is shown in a Let's Play format while the PlayStation.Blog team discusses the game with the developer.

Content
Each issue consists of two CD-ROMs that can be played on a PlayStation or a PlayStation 2 console, or an emulator.

Disc one
The Vault - A collection of playable game demos of upcoming Sony Computer Entertainment America game titles.
Code Book - Hints, cheat codes and strategy guides for video games.
Imports - Preview of games from around the world such as Europe and Japan which have yet to be released in the United States.
Download Station - Additional game content, such as extra secret levels or hidden characters, which are saved into the memory card for use with certain games, similar to DLC.
Tech Q&A - A section which asks and answers questions behind product development and the PlayStation's technological capabilities.
Debriefing - Video interviews with major video game designers who work with the PlayStation console.
Behind the Scenes - A look at the "making of" video games, commercial spots, etc.
Event Center - A highlight of current happenings in the PlayStation brand, promotions and marketing events.
Bulletins - Exclusive special notices and opportunities for PlayStation Underground club members.
Transmission - A feature showcasing upcoming features and contests.
Alphas - Exclusive previews and premieres of upcoming games.
Hidden Content - Each issue had various Easter Eggs hidden throughout the sections including cheat codes, game movies, and game demos.

Disc two
The second disc contains mostly demos of upcoming games as well as game trailers. For example, in the second issue of PlayStation Underground the second disc was a Square themed disc containing demos to Final Fantasy VII and Bushido Blade as well as exclusive upcoming trailers of new Square games.

Notable interviews
PlayStation Underground featured video interviews with many high-profile game designers as well as other notable figures in the entertainment industry internationally during their Debriefing, Tech Q&A and Behind The Scenes segments, these include:
Dave Jaffe (Incognito Entertainment) - Twisted Metal 2, Twisted Metal: Black
Hironobu Sakaguchi (Square) - Final Fantasy VII
Nobuo Uematsu (Square) - Final Fantasy VII
Yoshinori Kitase (Square) - Final Fantasy VII
Todd McFarlane (Acclaim Entertainment) - Spawn
Kazuo Hirai (Sony Computer Entertainment) - Sony Computer Entertainment
Masaya Matsuura (NanaOn-Sha)  - PaRappa the Rapper
Stewart Copeland (The Police) - Spyro the Dragon
Ken Kutaragi (Sony Computer Entertainment) - "Next Generation PlayStation"
Phil Harrison (Sony Computer Entertainment) - "Next Generation PlayStation"
Tomonobu Itagaki (Team Ninja) - "Next Generation PlayStation"
Kazunori Yamauchi (Polyphony Digital) - Gran Turismo 2
Shuhei Yoshida (Japan Studio) - Ape Escape
Tony Hawk (Neversoft) - Tony Hawk's Pro Skater
Jason Rubin (Naughty Dog) - Crash Bandicoot 2: Cortex Strikes Back, Crash Bandicoot: Warped, Crash Team Racing
Ted Price (Insomniac Games) - Spyro the Dragon, Spyro 2: Ripto's Rage!
Tokuro Fujiwara (Whoopee Camp) - Tomba! 2: The Evil Swine Return
Hideo Kojima (Kojima Productions) - Metal Gear Solid 2: Sons of Liberty

History
PlayStation Underground's 'Holiday 2004' demo disc was released with a major glitch that caused the save data to be wiped on all memory cards connected to the PlayStation 2 if the demo for Viewtiful Joe 2 was played. Sony sent an email to subscribers of the magazine warning users to remove the memory cards from the PlayStation 2 before inserting the demo disc.

Staff
The staff of PlayStation Underground included:
 Narrator - Gary Barth
 Narrator - Chris Colon
 Senior Executive Producer – Andrew House
 Senior Producer - Perry Rodgers
 Executive Producer - Peter Dille
 Producer – Gary Barth
 Marketing Director – Colin MacLean
 Marketing Manage - Michelle Vercelli
 Audio - Buzz Burrowes
 Music Composition, Sound Effects - Nathan Brenholdt
 Music Composition - Chuck Doud
 Marketing Coordinator - Yvonne Smith 
 Marketing Coordinator, Product Manager - Kim Yuen
 Creative Director - Alan Drummer
 Test Manager - Mark Pentek
 Art Staff - Christian Lowe
 Tip Team - Francesca Reyes

References

External links
 Original Press Release
 Official Page at Giant Bomb
 Complete list of Playstation Underground content

PlayStation (brand) magazines
Monthly magazines published in the United States
Magazines established in 1997
Video game magazines published in the United States
1997 establishments in California
2001 disestablishments in California
Magazines disestablished in 2001
Defunct computer magazines published in the United States
Magazines published in California
PlayStation (console) games
PlayStation 2 games